James Joseph Paciorek (born June 7, 1960) is an American former professional baseball player. He played first base, third base, and outfield for the Milwaukee Brewers of Major League Baseball (MLB). He also played with the Yokohama Taiyo Whales and Hanshin Tigers in the Japanese Central League.

His two older brothers, John and Tom, also played in the Major Leagues.

Biography
After graduating from  Orchard Lake St. Marys Preparatory, Paciorek played on both the baseball and American football teams while attending the University of Michigan. In 1980, he played collegiate summer baseball with the Falmouth Commodores of the Cape Cod Baseball League. He graduated in 1981, and was drafted in the 14th round by the Cleveland Indians, but did not sign with the Indians. He was chosen in the 8th round by the Milwaukee Brewers the following year, and signed with the Brewers in 1982. He spent most of his career in the minor leagues, but played 48 major league games in 1987.

Paciorek had actually traveled to Japan during his college years to play in the Japanese college baseball league, and he chose to sign with the Yokohama Taiyo Whales (current Yokohama DeNA BayStars) in 1988. He ranked second in the league with a .332 average, and won the outfield Best Nine award that year. He remained one of the league's best hitters, batting 5th behind teammate Carlos Ponce, and won the Central League batting title in 1990. Paciorek ended the season with a batting average over .300 for the fourth straight year in 1991, but was cut from the team for hitting only 11 home runs.

The Whales had made a bad decision in cutting Paciorek, as he had his best season in 1992 playing with the Hanshin Tigers. Paciorek had joined the Tigers at the suggestion of Tom O'Malley, and he led the league in hits to win a Best Nine award at first base. He also won the Central League golden glove award that year.

Paciorek suffered a hip injury in 1993, and failed reach the .300 mark for the first time in Japan, hitting only 7 home runs with a .243 batting average. He was dropped by the Tigers during the off-season, and sought to play in the major leagues after returning to the United States, but retired shortly afterwards.

On April 6, 2004, Paciorek traveled to Japan after 11 years to participate in the opening ceremony of a game between the Hanshin Tigers and Yokohama BayStars at Yokohama Stadium. Old-time fans of both teams still remembered Paciorek's contributions to Japanese baseball, and greeted him enthusiastically as he threw the opening pitch.

References

External links

1960 births
Living people
Major League Baseball first basemen
Milwaukee Brewers players
Yokohama Taiyō Whales players
Hanshin Tigers players
Michigan Wolverines baseball players
American expatriate baseball players in Japan
Baseball players from Detroit
World Games gold medalists
Competitors at the 1981 World Games
All-American college baseball players
Falmouth Commodores players